The Battle of Badung Strait was a naval battle of the Pacific campaign of World War II, fought on the night of 19/20 February 1942 in Badung Strait (not to be confused with the West Java city of Bandung) between the American-British-Dutch-Australian Command (ABDA) and the Imperial Japanese Navy. In the engagement, the four Japanese destroyers defeated an Allied force that outnumbered and outgunned them, sinking the Dutch destroyer  and  escorting two transports to safety. The battle demonstrated the Japanese Navy's considerable superiority over the Allies in night fighting which lasted until the Battle of Cape St. George.

Background
A battalion of the 48th Infantry Division of the Imperial Japanese Army landed on Bali on 18 February 1942. Dutch Admiral Karel Doorman's naval forces were scattered around Indonesia, but the invasion of Bali could not be ignored – it would give the Japanese an airbase within range of the ABDA naval base at Surabaya – so he sent in all available ships. The short notice gave no time to concentrate his ships; accordingly, several Allied forces were to attack the Japanese.

Battle
Both attacked the Japanese convoy on 18 February, but did no damage and were driven off by depth charges from Japanese destroyers. Later that day, 20 planes of the United States Army Air Forces attacked the convoy but succeeded only in damaging the transport Sagami Maru.

The Japanese were aware that their invasion convoy was likely to be attacked again, so they retreated north as soon as possible. The last ships to leave were the transports, each escorted by two destroyers.

No damage was done in this exchange of fire, and the two Dutch cruisers continued through the strait to the northeast, to give the destroyers a free hand to engage with torpedoes. Then Piet Hein, Pope and John D. Ford came into range. At 22:40, a Long Lance torpedo from Asashio hit Piet Hein, sinking the Dutch destroyer immediately. Asashio and Oshio then exchanged gunfire with Pope and John D. Ford, forcing the two American destroyers to retire to the southeast instead of following the cruisers to the northeast.

In the darkness, Asashio and Oshio mistook each other for enemy ships and fired on each other for several minutes, without any damage.

At 01:36, Stewart, Pillsbury and Parrott launched torpedoes but did no damage. Then Oshio and Asashio sortied again and there was another exchange of gunfire. Tromp was hit by eleven  shells from Asashio, severely damaging her and hit both Japanese destroyers, killing four men on Asashio and seven on Oshio. Tromp later had to return to Australia for repairs.

Arashio and Michishio had been ordered by Admiral Kubo to turn back, and at about 02:20 they joined the battle. Michishio was hit by shells from Pillsbury, John D. Edwards and Tromp, killing 13 of her crew and wounding 83. She lost speed and had to be towed after the battle. During these exchanges, Stewart was also damaged topside and one shell hit opened seams below the waterline aft and flooded the steering engine room.  Both groups of ships turned away, and the engagement was over.

Aftermath

The third ABDA group—seven torpedo boats—arrived in Badung Strait at about 06:00 but did not encounter any Japanese ships. The battle was a significant victory for the Japanese. Lieutenant Commander Gorō Yoshii of Asashio and Commander Kiyoshi Kikkawa of Oshio had shown great bravery and skill. They had driven off a much larger Allied force, sunk the destroyer Piet Hein, damaged the destroyer Stewart and severely damaged the cruiser Tromp. Meanwhile, the Japanese had sustained little damage themselves, and had protected their transport ships.

Bali's garrison of 600 Indonesian militia offered no resistance to the Japanese, and its airfield was captured intact. The Japanese continued their conquest of the Dutch East Indies with the capture of Timor from 20–23 February. The ABDA forces engaged at Badung Strait were decisively defeated in the Battle of the Java Sea on 27 February 1942, in which the Dutch cruisers Java and De Ruyter were sunk and Admiral Doorman was killed. Tromp evaded this fate, for she was withdrawn to Australia to repair damage suffered at Badung Strait. The US destroyer Stewart was sufficiently damaged that she had to be placed in dry-dock for repairs in Soerabaia, where she was scuttled to avoid capture by the rapidly advancing Japanese. She was raised, repaired and put into Japanese service a year later as the patrol vessel P-102.

Notes

References

Further reading

 To the Java Sea: Selections from the Diary, Letters and Reports of Henry E. Eccles, 1940-1942, commanding officer, USS John D. Edwards.
Order of battle
O'Hara, Vincent, Battle of Badung Strait
Ramires, Felipe C. The fall of Bali and the naval battle of the Badoeng Strait 18 – 20 February 1942
Womack, Tom Fire in the Night: The loss of Bali and Timor
Womack, Tom (February 1996), Battle of Badoeng Strait: World War II Naval Duel off Bali

Badung Strait
Badung Strait
Badung Strait
Badung Strait
Badung Strait
Japanese occupation of the Dutch East Indies
History of Bali
1942 in Japan
1942 in the Dutch East Indies
February 1942 events